Megahit-International Mediterranean Song Contest was an international song contest hosted in Turkey featuring singers from Mediterranean countries. There were three editions of the event. Nine countries participated in the first event, which was held in 2002 in Antalya. The second and third editions were organized in Fethiye, Muğla. The number of participants grew and reached 14 in 2003, and to 15 in 2004. The three contest winners were Eyal Shachar of Israel, Sedat Yüce of Turkey and Linda Valori of Italy, respectively.

History 

Created by End Productions, the first edition of Megahit-International Mediterranean Song Contest (Turkish: Megahit-Uluslararası Akdeniz Şarkı Yarışması) was organized in Aspendos Theatre in Antalya on October 13, 2002. 9 Mediterranean countries participated in the contest, each represented by one performer. Serhat Hacıpaşalıoğlu, president of End Productions, hosted the event with Tuğçe Kazaz and Çağla Kubat. Israeli singer Eyal Schahar won the contest with "The Puppet Show". Croatian singer Goran Karan finished in second place with "I'm Falling Into Dark", with Hüseyin Özkılıç of Turkey placing third with "Bir Kez Daha". The winner of the contest was awarded  $5,000 and a plate specially created for the event. Additionally, some contestants chosen by the jury were awarded with the International Federation of Festival Organizations (FIDOF) Special Prize and City of Antalya Special Prize.

The second edition of the contest was organized in Fethiye Stadium, Fethiye, Muğla on September 27, 2003. There were 14 participating countries in the contest, which was hosted by Serhat Hacıpaşalıoğlu and Viktor Lazlo. Sedat Yüce from Turkey won the contest with "Nereye Kadar?". The International Federation of Festival Organizations Special Prize was given to Egyptian singer Amira Ahmed, and the Municipality of Fethiye Special Prize was given to Croatian singer Claudia Beni. The top three performers were awarded vacations from Lykia World. Furthermore, the event was named “best music festival of the year” by FIDOF, and Serhat Hacıpaşalıoğlu was awarded with the Annual Golden Transitional Media Ring of Friendship for his role as “best festival host of the year”. The contest was broadcast on TRT 1.

The third and final edition of the contest was held again in Fethiye Stadium on September 15, 2004 The number of participating countries raised to 15. This time, Azra Akın and Deniz Seki were the hosting partners of Serhat Hacıpaşalıoğlu. Italian performer Linda Valori won the contest with "E Vai" and was awarded a €10,000 prize. Julie & Ludwig from Malta earned second place with "Mood Swing", and Slovenian performer Nuša Derenda finished in third place with "Devil". The Lifetime Achievement Prize was awarded to Olcayto Ahmet Tuğsuz and Elias Rahbani, while the Fethiye Special Prizes were awarded to Greek contestant Chris Vamos and Portuguese contestant Ricardo Costa. The event was broadcast live on Show TV.

Editions

Participants by year

2002 

 Note: Georgina was going to represent Malta with "Fomm il-Vjolin", but later she rejected from the contest.

2003

2004

References

External links 

 Contest page in End Productions official website 

Song contests
Entertainment events in Turkey
Turkish music
Recurring events established in 2002
Recurring events disestablished in 2004
2002 establishments in Turkey
2004 disestablishments in Turkey